On 29 March 2022, Russian forces carried out a missile strike (supposedly using Kalibr missile) on the Mykolaiv Regional State Administration's headquarters during the battle of Mykolaiv. It resulted in at least 37 deaths and 34 injuries.

Missile strike
The missile strike left half of the building destroyed, leaving a massive hole inside the building's structure and triggering numerous fires. The governor's office was destroyed.

As a result of the attack, 37 people were killed and 34 were injured.

Governor of Mykolaiv Oblast Vitaliy Kim overslept that night, preventing him from going to work and saving his life. Initially, the governor said that eight people were still trapped under the rubble and three soldiers remained missing.

Ukrainian President Volodymyr Zelenskyy confirmed reports about the missile strike shortly later in a video to the Danish Folketing.

Videos

Victims 

Military personnel of the TrO:
 Vladyslav Ihorovych Lyutov
 Volodymyr Serhiyovych Motelchuk
 
 Kostyantyn Viktorovych Opliata
 Dmytro Volodymyrovych Ostryanin
 
 Anton Dmytrovych Salnis
 Andriy Vasyliovych Stepasyuk
 Serhiy Viktorovych Farafonov
 Serhiy Yevheniyovych Shamonin

Personnel of the State Special Communications:
 
 
Military personnel of the :
 Vladyslav Oleksandrovych Arkushenko
 Kyrylo Vasyliovych Oberemenko
 Volodymyr Volodymyrovych Tokariev
 Maxym Volodymyrovych Fedorov
Employees of the :
 Anastasia Olehivna Dolhova
 

ODA employees:
 Maria Yosypivna Bincheva
 Anzhelika Myroslavivna Buchkovska
 Oksana Viktorivna Havrysh
 Iryna Serhiivna Hryhorenko
 Tetyana Anatolyivna Demennikova
 Olha Hryhorivna Zablotska
 Zulfiya Mukaddasivna Kapusta
 Iryna Volodymyrivna Kochetova
 Natalya Volodymyrivna Lavrinenko
 Valeriya Oleksandrivna Lysik

 Andrii Ivanovych Litvinov
 Svitlana Mykolaivna Popova
 Artem Olehovych Solonar
 Olena Mykhailivna Turbina–Khlopina
 Stanislav Vyacheslavovych Khaitov
 Mykola Oleksandrovych Khomrovyi
 Vitaliy Volodymyrovych Shamrayev
KP employees:
 Oleksandr Oleksandrovych Boyko
 Andrii Yevheniyovych Tyanulin

See also 
 Battle of Mykolaiv
 Mykolaiv cluster bombing

References

External links 
 

Airstrikes conducted by Russia
Airstrikes during the 2022 Russian invasion of Ukraine
Attacks on buildings and structures in 2022
Attacks on buildings and structures in Ukraine
Attacks on government buildings and structures
Battle of Mykolaiv
March 2022 crimes in Europe
March 2022 events in Ukraine
War crimes during the 2022 Russian invasion of Ukraine
Mass murder in 2022
21st-century mass murder in Ukraine